The Oklahoma Corporation Commission is the public utilities commission of the U.S state of Oklahoma run by three statewide elected commissioners. Authorized to employ more than 400 employees, it regulates oil and gas drilling, utilities and telephone companies.

History
The commission was established in 1907 and the First Oklahoma Legislature gave the commission authority to regulate public service corporations.

Railroad, telephone and telegraph companies were the companies first regulated by the commission, which also collected records of the stockholders, officers and directors of corporations chartered or licensed to do business in Oklahoma. Record collection duties were later split; the commission keeping records only for public service companies. The commission added pipelines, water, heat, light and power in early years.

The commission began regulating oil and gas in 1914 and was given additional regulatory power over the industry the following year.

Terms and qualifications
Candidates for the commission must be a citizen of Oklahoma for over two years before their election, at least 30 years of age and have no interest in any entity regulated by the commission.

Commissioners serve a six-year term. The terms are staggered so that one commissioner is up for re-election every two years, in even-numbered years. The chair of the commission is determined by the three commissioners.

In case of vacancy the Governor of Oklahoma appoints a replacement, to stand until the next general election. The commissioner elected at that election will serve the remaining unexpired term, so as to maintain the staggered term system.

Duties
The Commission regulates and enforces the laws and supervised the actives associated with:
 The exploration and production of oil and gas
 The storage and dispensing of petroleum based fuels
 The establishment of rates and services of public utilities
 The operation of intrastate transportation
 The administration of the Oklahoma Universal Service Fund for internet to schools, libraries, and qualified health centers.

Early emphasis for the commission was on regulation of railroad routes and rates. Through changes by the Legislature, and the change in services considered essential to the public welfare, the commission presently regulates public utilities, oil and gas industry (exploration, drilling, production and waste disposal), motor carrier transport, and petroleum products industry (transportation, storage, quality and dispensing). The commission also monitors a number of federal programs for compliance in Oklahoma. The commission also oversees the conservation of natural resources, avoiding waste production, abate pollution of the environment, and balancing the rights and needs of the people of Oklahoma with those of the regulated entities. The Public Utility Division acts as the Administrator for the states $30 million Universal Services Fund. This fund supports rural telecommunications as well as internet to Oklahoma public schools, libraries, and health centers.

Membership
As of January 2023, the following are the members of the commission:

Notable former members
J. J. McAlester (member 1907-1911)
Jack C. Walton (member 1933-1939)
J.C. Watts (member 1990-1995, chairman 1993-1995), resigned to successfully run for Congress
Jim Roth (member 2007-2009), first ever openly LGBT person to hold a statewide elected office in Oklahoma
Jeff Cloud (member 2003-2011, chairman 2005-?)
Patrice Douglas (member, 2011-2015)

Organization

Corporation Commission
Judicial and Legislative Services-  The former Administration, Judicial, and General Counsel Divisions were merged in 2017 to increase efficiency and reduce costs. 
Administration Office- Responsible for providing central services to the Commission's division as well as direct support staff to the Commission members
Public Information Office
Finance Office
Human Resources Office
Administrative Programs Office
Office of the Secretary to the Commission
Administrative Hearings Office - responsible for overseeing all hearings and appeals of the Commission's regulations
Office of the General Counsel - responsible for providing legal advice to the Commission
Agency Counsel Section
Consumer Services Section
Deliberations Section
Petroleum Storage Tank/Transportation Section
Oil and Gas Section
Public Utilities Section
Transportation Division - responsible for licensing and regulating commercial motor carriers, natural gas pipelines, and railroad companies, and administers the International Fuel Tax Agreement and International Registration Plan
Administrative and Regulatory Operations Unit
Administrative Support Department
Requirements Department
Enforcement Support Department
Safety Support Department
Field Operations Unit
Motor Carrier and Motor Vehicle Enforcement Department
Pipeline Safety Department
Railroad Department
IFTA/IRP Unit
IFTA/IRP Registration and Licensing Services Department
Audit Department
Technical Services Department
Oil and Gas Conservation Division - responsible for enforcing Commission rules that prevent pollution caused by oil and gas
Field Operations Department
District 1 Office - Bristow
District 2 Office - Kingfisher
District 3 Office - Duncan
District 4 Office - Ada
Pollution Abatement Underground Injection Control Department
Consumer Services Division - responsible for hearing complaints against regulated utilities and for overseeing appeals to the Commission members
Oil and Gas Complaints Department
Public Utility Complaints Department
Mineral Owners Escrow Account Department
Administrative Proceedings Office
Public Utilities Division - responsible for regulating electric power utilities, natural gas utilities, drinking water utilities, and telecommunications companies.
Energy Group- Handles all gas, electric, water, and cotton gin matters.
Telecommunications Group
Oklahoma Universal Services Group-Administers $30 million dollar OUSF. 
Consumer Services Group
Enforcement Group- Field safety throughout Oklahoma
Administrative Group
Petroleum Storage Tank Division - responsible for enforcing state and federal regulations and administers certain assistance programs applicable to the storage, quality, and delivery of refined petroleum products
Accounting Department
Administration Department
Compliance and Inspection Department
Technical Department
Information Technology Division - Consolidation with statewide OMES is in process.

Staffing
The commission, with an annual budget of over $60 million, is one of the larger employers of Oklahoma state government. For fiscal year 2012, the commission was authorized 430 full-time employees, but experience numerous vacancies.

References

External links
 Oklahoma Corporation Commission official website
 http://www.occeweb.com/pu/PUD%20Reports%20Page/pudreports.html
 http://www.occeweb.com/pu/OUSF/OUSF.htm

Oklahoma
Government agencies established in 1907
1907 establishments in Oklahoma